Eric Ayles (21 February 1928 – 26 May 1972) was an English professional rugby league footballer who played as a prop forward in the 1940s and 1950s. He played at representative level for Lancashire, and at club level for Belle Vue Rangers, St Helens and Salford.

Playing career
Ayles started his professional career with Belle Vue Rangers before signing for St Helens in September 1953.

In March 1956, he joined Salford on loan, before signing a permanent deal with the club in August 1956 for an estimated fee of £350. 

Ayles dislocated his shoulder in a match against Workington Town in April 1958, which forced him to retire.

Representative honours
Ayles made two appearances for Lancashire while at Belle Vue Rangers.

References

1928 births
1972 deaths
English rugby league players
Rugby league players from Wigan
Rugby league props
Broughton Rangers players
St Helens R.F.C. players
Salford Red Devils players
Lancashire rugby league team players